International Crook  (titled as 'Kala Bazaar' in Hindi) is a 1974 Bollywood film starring Dharmendra, Feroz Khan and Saira Banu.

Plot 
Superintendent of Police, Rajesh, is asked to take charge of a police station in Goa, and manage it. Rajesh is aware that his friend, Shekar, also lives there, and he is anxious to see him. Upon arrival in Goa, Rajesh and Shekar are delighted to see each other. Shekar is in love with Seema, and Seema too loves him. However, Seema's mother, Lajwanti, does not approve of Shekar, and would like Seema to marry Rajesh. When Shekar learns of this, he steps away, so that Rajesh and Seema can marry each other. When Rajesh finds out about Shekar's sacrifice, he decides to let Seema marry Shekar, and shortly thereafter the marriage takes place. While Shekar and Seema go off on their honeymoon, Rajesh commences his investigation into smuggling activities off the coast of Goa, and his investigations lead him to a suspect named Tiger. Little does Rajesh know, that Tiger is none other an alias for Shekar, who will do anything to protect himself from Rajesh and the police.

Cast 
 Dharmendra as Shekhar
 Feroz Khan as SP Rajesh
 Saira Banu as Seema
 Om Prakash aa Havaldar Rao
 Sulochana Chatterjee as Lajwanti
 Murad as Police commissioner
 Jagdish Raj as Inspector Maria
 Jagdeep as D.D.T.
 Jayshree T. DDT's girlfriend
 Sunder as Jayshree T's father
 Manorama as Jayshree T's mother
 Raj Mehra as Chief Inspector of Customs Divan Dinanath
 Hiralal (actor) as Kaka Sheth
 M. B. Shetty as Jaggu
 Rajan Haksar as Pinto
 Susheela (as Sushila)
 Rathod
 Habib as Foreman, Supervisor
 Pachhi as Jamal Pasha
 Shyam Kumar as Long John
 Gurdeep Singh as Buta Singh
 Master Shahid as young Shekhar

Soundtrack

References

External links 
 

1974 films
1970s Hindi-language films
Films scored by Shankar–Jaikishan